Champion warfare refers to a type of battle, most commonly found in the epic poetry and myth of ancient history, in which the outcome of the conflict is determined by single combat, an individual duel between the best soldiers ("champions") from each opposing army. Champion warfare can also refer to a battle in which armies actually engage, but champions within the armies fight so effectively as to single-handedly carry the sway of battle, such as in the Iliad.

Champion warfare in literature 
 Numerous instances of champion warfare can be observed in Homer's Iliad, most notably the climactic battle between Achilles and Hector, although there are many more.
 Champion warfare has numerous examples in Ferdowsi's Shahnameh (Book of Kings).
 Champion warfare is a common theme in the early books of Livy's history of Rome Ab Urbe Condita (From the Founding of the City), including the story of the famous triplets of the Horatii and Curiatii families and the great champion Horatius Cocles.
 Large-scale battles in the Chinese novels Romance of the Three Kingdoms and Water Margin typically begin with champion combat.
 The Combat of the Thirty in 1351 between competing French lineages was held as a model of chivalric combat.
 Champion warfare is a common occurrence in Indian epics such as the Mahabharata and the Ramayana. The latter's fate is decisively determined by Rama, and his nemesis Ravana
 In the Bible, the battle between David and Goliath is an example of champion warfare. Group champion combat, where a certain number of champions from each side battle, also existed, as shown in the Battle of Gibeon, where General Abner, loyal to King Ish-bosheth, had twelve champions duel twelve warriors chosen from the ranks of King David's army by General Joab. (2 Samuel 2:12–17 describes the duels themselves.)
 Champion warfare is a common theme in Irish mythology, notably in the Ulster Cycle, with Cú Chulainn fighting many duels.
 In the Old High German Hildebrandslied, champion warfare between a father and his son are the main theme.
 American science fiction writer Fredric Brown wrote the 1944 story Arena, in which a single human and a single malevolent alien fight to the death as the champions of their respective species.

See also

 Single combat
 Holmgang

References 

Warfare by type
Ancient warfare